In enzymology, a glutamate synthase (NADH) is an enzyme that catalyzes the chemical reaction

2 L-glutamate + NAD+  L-glutamine + 2-oxoglutarate + NADH + H+

Glutamate synthase facilitates the ammonium assimilation pathway, which follows the enzymes, nitrite reductase and glutamine synthase. An ammonium produced by the nitrite reductase reaction will be incorporated into carbon skeleton backbone by glutamine synthase. Glutamine will be produced because of the introduction of ammonium in the carbon backbone, which can be converted into glutamate by glutamate synthase of another pathway.

These processes are common in plant roots due to the fact that if the nitrogen deficient conditions exist (with access to ammonium and nitrate ions), there will be a first priority of ammonium uptake. Thus, the two substrates of this enzyme are L-glutamate and NAD+, whereas its 4 products are L-glutamine, 2-oxoglutarate, NADH, and H+.

This enzyme belongs to the family of oxidoreductases, specifically those acting on the CH-NH2 group of donors with NAD+ or NADP+ as acceptor.  This enzyme participates in glutamate metabolism and nitrogen assimilation.  It employs one cofactor, FMN.

Nomenclature 

The systematic name of this enzyme class is L-glutamate:NAD+ oxidoreductase (transaminating). Other names in common use include:
 glutamate (reduced nicotinamide adenine dinucleotide) synthase, 
 glutamate synthase (NADH),
 L-glutamate synthetase(NADH), 
 NADH-dependent glutamate synthase, 
 NADH-glutamate synthase, and
 NADH-Glutamine oxoglutarate aminotransferase (NADH-GOGAT).

See also
Glutamate synthase (ferredoxin)
Glutamate synthase (NADPH)

References

 

EC 1.4.1
NADH-dependent enzymes
Flavoproteins
Enzymes of unknown structure